The Smith family is the name of an American family with many members prominent in religion and politics.  The family's most famous member was Joseph Smith Jr., founder of the Latter Day Saint movement. Many other members of the family took on leadership roles in various churches within the movement.

First generation

Joseph Smith Sr.
 Lived 1771–1840
 Married: Lucy Mack in 1795
 Father of Alvin, Hyrum, Sophronia, Joseph Jr., Samuel, Ephraim, William, Catherine or Katharine, Don Carlos, and Lucy (see Joseph Smith-History 1:4 and “Family of Joseph Smith, Sr. and Lucy Mack Smith: First Family of the Restoration,” December 2005 Ensign magazine)
 brother of John Smith

Lucy Mack Smith
 Lived 1775–1856
 Married: Joseph Smith Sr. in 1795
 Mother of Alvin, Hyrum, Sophronia, Joseph Jr., Samuel, Ephraim, William, Catherine or Katharine, Don Carlos, and Lucy (see Joseph Smith-History 1:4 and “Family of Joseph Smith, Sr. and Lucy Mack Smith: First Family of the Restoration,” December 2005 Ensign magazine)

John Smith
 Lived: 1781–1854
 brother of Joseph Smith Sr.
 father of George A. Smith

Second generation: children of Joseph Smith Sr. and Lucy Mack

Alvin Smith
 Lived: 1798–1823
 Oldest child of Joseph Smith Sr. and Lucy Mack Smith
 Brother of Hyrum Smith, Sophronia Smith McCleary, Joseph Smith Jr., Samuel H. Smith, William Smith, Katharine Smith Salisbury, Don Carlos Smith, and Lucy Smith Millikin

Hyrum Smith
 Lived: 1800–1844
 Second son of Joseph Smith Sr. and Lucy Mack Smith
 Brother of Alvin Smith, Sophronia Smith McCleary, Joseph Smith Jr., Samuel H. Smith, William Smith, Katharine Smith Salisbury, Don Carlos Smith, and Lucy Smith Millikin

Sophronia Smith McCleary 
 Lived: 1803–1876
 Oldest daughter of Joseph Smith Sr. and Lucy Mack Smith
 Sister of Alvin Smith, Hyrum Smith, Joseph Smith Jr., Samuel H. Smith, William Smith, Katharine Smith Salisbury, Don Carlos Smith, and Lucy Smith Millikin
 Married: Calvin W. Stoddard in 1827. Husband died 1836.
 Married: William McCleary in 1838.

Joseph Smith Jr.
 Lived: 1805–1844
 Founder of The Church of Jesus Christ of Latter-day Saints Latter Day Saint movement
 Mayor of Nauvoo, Illinois 1842–44
 Candidate for President of the United States 1844
 son of Joseph Smith Sr. and Lucy Mack Smith
 Brother of Alvin Smith, Hyrum Smith, Sophronia Smith McCleary, Samuel H. Smith, William Smith, Katharine Smith Salisbury, Don Carlos Smith, and Lucy Smith Millikin
 Father of Joseph Smith III
 Married: Emma Hale in 1827

Samuel H. Smith
 Lived: 1808–1844
 Brother of Alvin Smith, Hyrum Smith, Sophronia Smith McCleary, Joseph Smith Jr., William Smith, Katharine Smith Salisbury, Don Carlos Smith, and Lucy Smith Millikin

William Smith
 Lived: 13 March 1811 – 13 November 1894
 Illinois State Legislature 1842
 Brother of Alvin Smith, Hyrum Smith, Sophronia Smith McCleary, Joseph Smith Jr., Samuel H. Smith, Katharine Smith Salisbury, Don Carlos Smith, and Lucy Smith Millikin
 Married: Caroline Amanda Grant, sister of Jedidiah Morgan Grant and Roxie Ann Grant
 Married: Roxie Ann Grant after her sister Caroline's death

Katharine Smith Salisbury
 Lived: July 8, 1813 – February 1, 1900
 Sister of Alvin Smith, Hyrum Smith, Sophronia Smith McCleary, Joseph Smith Jr., Samuel H. Smith, William Smith, Don Carlos Smith, and Lucy Smith Millikin
 Married: Wilkins Jenkins Salisbury (died 1853) (1831)
 Married: Joseph Younger (later divorced) (1857)

Don Carlos Smith
 Lived: 1816–1841
 Brother of Alvin Smith, Hyrum Smith, Sophronia Smith McCleary, Joseph Smith Jr., Samuel H. Smith, William Smith, Katharine Smith Salisbury, and Lucy Smith Millikin

Lucy Smith Millikin
 Lived 1821–1882
 Sister of Alvin Smith, Hyrum Smith, Sophronia Smith McCleary, Joseph Smith Jr., Samuel H. Smith, William Smith, Don Carlos Smith, and Katharine Smith Salisbury
 Married Arthur Millikin.

Second generation: cousins to the Smiths

The following individuals were children of brothers of Joseph Smith Sr. They were first-cousins to Alvin Smith, Hyrum Smith, Joseph Smith Jr., Samuel H. Smith, William Smith, and Don Carlos Smith

Elias Smith
 Lived: 1804–1888
 son of Asael Smith Jr. and Elizabeth Schellenger

George A. Smith
 Lived: 26 June 1817 – 1 September 1875
 Utah Territorial Legislature 1851, 1867; Utah Territorial Supreme Court 1855, Utah Territory delegate to U.S. Congress 1856
 Son of John Smith
 Father of John Henry Smith

Silas S. Smith
 Lived: 26 October 1830 – 11 October 1910
 Utah Territorial Legislature 1859, 69, 78
 Son of Silas Smith Sr.
 Brother of Jesse Nathaniel Smith

Jesse N. Smith
 Lived: 2 December 1834 – 5 June 1906
 Mayor of Parowan, Utah 1859; Arizona Territorial Legislature 19th Session
 Son of Silas Smith Sr.
 Brother of Silas S. Smith
 His daughter, Leah, married John Hunt Udall, mayor of Phoenix, AZ
 His son Asahel Henry Smith married Pauline Udall, daughter of David King Udall

John Lyman Smith
 Lived 17 November 1828 – 21 February 1898
 Utah Territorial Legislature 1852, 1853; 1853–1855
 Son of John Smith

Third generation: children of Hyrum Smith

Joseph F. Smith
 Lived: 13 November 1838 – 19 November 1918
 Utah Territorial Legislature 1865–70, 1872, 1874, 1880, 1882
 President of The Church of Jesus Christ of Latter-day Saints, 1901–1918
 Son of Hyrum Smith and Mary Fielding (who remarried to Heber C. Kimball after Hyrum's death)
 half-brother of John Smith

John Smith
 Lived: 1832–1911
 son of Hyrum Smith and Jerusha Barden
 half-brother of Joseph F. Smith

Third generation: children of Joseph Smith Jr.

Julia Murdock Smith
 Lived: 1830–1880
 adopted daughter of Joseph Smith Jr. and Emma Hale
 sister of Joseph Smith III, Alexander Hale Smith, and David Hyrum Smith

Joseph Smith III
 Lived: 6 November 1832 – 10 December 1914
 Prophet–President of the Reorganized Church of Jesus Christ of Latter Day Saints (now Community of Christ) for 54 years
 Founder of Lamoni, Iowa
 Founder of Graceland University
 Three sons succeeded him as Prophet–President of the Reorganized Church of Jesus Christ of Latter Day Saints - Frederick Madison Smith, Israel A. Smith and W. Wallace Smith.
 Son of Joseph Smith Jr. and Emma Hale
 Brother of Julia Murdock Smith, Alexander Hale Smith, and David Hyrum Smith
 Nephew of Hyrum Smith
 1st cousin of Joseph F. Smith
 1st Cousin once removed of Utah Judge Elias Smith Sr
 Married: Emmeline Griswold in 1854 and had five children
 Married: Bertha Madison in 1869, after the death of Emmeline Griswold, and had nine children
 Married: Ada Clark in 1898, after the death of Bertha Madison, and had three children

Alexander Hale Smith
 Lived: 1838–1909
 Son of Joseph Smith Jr. and Emma Hale
 Brother of Julia Murdock Smith, Joseph Smith III, and David Hyrum Smith

David Hyrum Smith
 Lived: 1844–1904
 Son of Joseph Smith Jr. and Emma Hale
 Brother of Julia Murdock Smith, Joseph Smith III, and Alexander Hale Smith

Third generation: children of Don Carlos Smith

Ina Coolbrith (born Josephine Anna Smith)
 Lived: 1841–1928
 daughter of Don Carlos Smith and Agnes Moulton Coolbrith

Third generation: children of Smith cousins

John Henry Smith
 Lived: 18 September 1848 – 13 October 1911   
 Utah Territorial Legislature 1882
 Son of George A. Smith
 Half-brother of Clarissa Smith Williams

Clarissa Smith Williams
 Lived: 1859–1930
 Daughter of George A. Smith and Susan West
 Half-sister of John Henry Smith

Fourth generation: descended from Hyrum Smith

Hyrum M. Smith
 Lived: 1872–1918
 Son of Joseph F. Smith, grandson of Hyrum Smith
 Brother of Joseph Fielding Smith and David A. Smith

Joseph Fielding Smith
 Lived: 1876–1972
 Son of Joseph F. Smith, grandson of Hyrum Smith
 Brother of Hyrum M. Smith and David A. Smith
 President of The Church of Jesus Christ of Latter-day Saints, 1970–1972

David A. Smith
 Lived: 1879–1952
 Son of Joseph F. Smith, grandson of Hyrum Smith
 Brother of Hyrum M. Smith and Joseph Fielding Smith

Fourth generation: descended from Joseph Smith Jr.

Frederick M. Smith
 Lived: 1874–1946
 Son of Joseph Smith III, grandson of Joseph Smith Jr.
 Brother of Israel A. Smith and W. Wallace Smith
 Prophet–President of the Reorganized Church of Jesus Christ of Latter Day Saints, 1915–1946

Israel A. Smith
 Lived: 2 February 1876 – 14 June 1958
 Iowa State Legislature 1911-1913
 Elected as delegate to the Missouri Constitutional Convention, 1943–1944
 Prophet–President of the Reorganized Church of Jesus Christ of Latter Day Saints, 1946–1958
 Son of Joseph Smith III, grandson of Joseph Smith Jr.
 Brother of Frederick M. Smith and W. Wallace Smith
 Married: Nina Grenawalt in 1908, and had two sons

W. Wallace Smith
 Lived: 1900–1989
 Son of Joseph Smith III, grandson of Joseph Smith Jr.
 Brother of Frederick M. Smith and Israel A. Smith
 Prophet–President of the Reorganized Church of Jesus Christ of Latter Day Saints, 1958–1978

Emma Smith Kennedy
 Lived: 1869–1960
 Daughter of Alexander Hale Smith, granddaughter of Joseph Smith Jr.

Elbert A. Smith
 Lived: 1871–1959
 Son of David Hyrum Smith, grandson of Joseph Smith Jr.

Fourth generation: descended from Smith cousins

George Albert Smith
 Lived: 1870–1951
 Son of John Henry Smith and Sarah Farr
 Half-brother of Nicholas G. Smith
 President of The Church of Jesus Christ of Latter-day Saints, 1945–1951

Nicholas G. Smith
 Lived: 1881–1945
 Son of John Henry Smith and Josephine Groesbeck
 Half-brother of George Albert Smith

Richard R. Lyman
 Lived: 1870–1963
 Son of Francis M. Lyman and Clara Caroline Callister, a granddaughter of John Smith

Fifth generation: descended from Hyrum Smith

Hyrum G. Smith
 Lived: 1879–1932
 grandson of John Smith, great-grandson of Hyrum Smith

Joseph Fielding Smith
 Lived: 1899–1964
 son of Hyrum M. Smith, grandson of Joseph F. Smith, great-grandson of Hyrum Smith

Florence Smith Jacobsen
 Lived: 1913–2017
 daughter of Willard Richards Smith, granddaughter of Joseph F. Smith, great-granddaughter of Hyrum Smith

Fifth generation: descended from Joseph Smith Jr.

Wallace B. Smith
 Lived: 1929–
 son of W. Wallace Smith, grandson of Joseph Smith III, great-grandson of Joseph Smith Jr.
 Prophet–President of the Reorganized Church of Jesus Christ of Latter Day Saints, 1978–1996

Fifth generation: descended from Smith cousins

George Albert Smith Jr.
 Lived: 1905–1969
 son of George Albert Smith, grandson of John Henry Smith, great-grandson of George A. Smith

Later generations

Descended from Hyrum Smith

Eldred G. Smith
 Lived: 1907–2013
 son of Hyrum G. Smith, great-grandson of John Smith, great-great-grandson of Hyrum Smith

M. Russell Ballard
 Lived: 1928–
 grandson of Hyrum M. Smith, great-grandson of Joseph F. Smith, great-great-grandson of Hyrum Smith

Joseph Fielding McConkie
 Lived: 1941–2013
 grandson of Joseph Fielding Smith, great-grandson of Joseph F. Smith, great-great-grandson of Hyrum Smith

Descended from Smith cousins

Jeff Groscost
 Died: November 3, 2006
 Arizona State Legislature 1992–2000 (speaker in 1998)
 3rd Great grandson of Jesse Nathaniel Smith

See also
 List of descendants of Joseph Smith Sr. and Lucy Mack Smith
 Latter Day Saint political history

External links
 

American Latter Day Saints